Upper 10 is a caffeine free drink lemon-lime soft drink, similar to Sprite, Sierra Mist, and Bubble Up. It was bottled by RC Cola.

The Upper 10 brand debuted in 1933 as a product of the Nehi Corporation (later Royal Crown Corporation). Upper 10 was one of RC Cola's flagship brands throughout the company's history. However, with the acquisition of RC Cola by Cadbury Schweppes plc in 2000 and subsequent folding of company operations into Dr Pepper, Inc., bottlers have gradually discontinued bottling Upper 10 in favor of the similar, more popular and non-caffeinated 7 Up (which is also owned by Dr Pepper Snapple Group).

Upper 10 is still sold outside North America by Cott Beverages, the same company that sells RC Cola internationally.

References

External links
 Upper 10

Lemon-lime sodas